The Pan-American television frequencies are different for terrestrial and cable television systems. Terrestrial television channels are divided into two bands: the VHF band which comprises channels 2 through 13 and occupies frequencies between 54 and 216 MHz, and the UHF band, which comprises channels 14 through 36 and occupies frequencies between 470 and 700 MHz.  These bands are different enough in frequency that they often require separate antennas to receive (although many antennas cover both VHF and UHF), and separate tuning controls on the television set.  The VHF band is further divided into two frequency ranges: VHF low band (Band I) between 54 and 88 MHz, containing channels 2 through 6, and VHF high band (Band III) between 174 and 216 MHz, containing channels 7 through 13.  The wide spacing between these frequency bands is responsible for the complicated design of rooftop TV antennas.  The UHF band has higher noise and greater attenuation, so higher gain antennas are often required for UHF.

Terrestrial television

History 

The VHF band plan was modified several times before 1948. The last of these changes was the deletion of channel 1, originally intended as a community channel. This allocation of the spectrum was given to two-way land-mobile radio.

UHF channels 70–83 in the United States were reallocated in 1983.

In March 2008, the FCC requested public comment on turning the bandwidth currently occupied by analog television channels 5 and 6 (76–88 MHz) over to extending the FM terrestrial band when the DTT transition was to be completed in February 2009 (ultimately delayed to June 2009). This proposed allocation would effectively assign frequencies corresponding to the existing Japanese FM radio service (which begins at 76 MHz) for use as an extension to the existing North American FM broadcast band.

700 MHz band 
The UHF 700 MHz band comprised the spectrum of UHF channels 52 through 69. Channels 52–69 are no longer available for normal, high-power digital terrestrial television broadcasting in the United States, but some channels are available for use as low-power or translator stations. Wireless microphones and medical telemetry devices shared some of the space on this television band, if transmitting at a very low power. After the migration to digital terrestrial television in 2009, the Federal Communications Commission (FCC) banned all of these from using the 700 MHz band, effective June 12, 2010. The 700 MHz band is now used for public safety communications and wireless broadband providers.

600 MHz band 
In 2017 the FCC auctioned off all remaining UHF spectrum including and above UHF channel 38.  This required the reconfiguration of channel allotment (known in the terrestrial television industry as the channel "repack"), allowing for higher gain small antennas to cover a smaller frequency range. In April 2017 it was decided that channels 38 to 51 would be deleted, but channel 37 remains reserved. Channel repacking proceeded in 10 phases from September 2018 through July 2020.

Channel frequencies

VHF band

UHF band 
The following table lists terrestrial television channels in the ultra high frequency band as they were allocated in their modern form by the Federal Communications Commission on April 11, 1952. The original allocation included 70 UHF channels (14–83) with 6 MHz separation.  In the decades since, many of the channels have been de-allocated and reserved for other purposes. Channels 14–36 are usable UHF channels in the United States after the most recent change was completed in 2020. Formerly allocated channels are indicated with a colored background, and their dispositions are explained in the notes below the table.

Notes 
 Channels 1 and 37 (shaded pink above) are reserved for radio astronomy in the United States, Canada, Bermuda and the Bahamas; thus there are no television stations assigned to it. Mexico, Colombia, Chile, Peru, Brazil and Argentina informally observe a ban on transmitters using the channel. One San Francisco station, KAXT-CD, was assigned Channel 1 as a virtual channel in 2017, but broadcasts on UHF channel 22. One New York City station, WNWT-LD, was assigned Channel 37 as a virtual channel in 2019, but broadcasts on VHF channel 3.
 Channels 38 through 51 (the 600 MHz band, shaded yellow above) have been displaced in the US by the Broadcast incentive auction.
 On August 22, 2011, the United States' Federal Communications Commission announced a freeze on all future applications for broadcast stations requesting to use channel 51, to prevent adjacent-channel interference to the A-Block of the 700 MHz band. Later that year (on December 16, 2011), Industry Canada and the CRTC followed suit in placing a moratorium on future television stations using channel 51 for broadcast use for the same reason. 
 Channels 52 through 69 (the 700 MHz band, shaded brown above) in the United States have been reallocated following the conversion to digital TV on June 12, 2009, although some low-power and translator stations may still be in use on these channels.
 The frequencies used by UHF channels 70 through 83 (shaded blue above) were reallocated to the Land Mobile Radio System (Public Safety and Trunked Radio) and mobile phones in a CCIR worldwide convention in 1983.
 With the advent of digital television in 2009, stations are allowed to identify themselves by a virtual channel that may not necessarily be the same as the station's RF channel. Virtual channels 1, 37, and 70 to 99 can be assigned via PSIP even though there is no corresponding physical station on that RF channel.

Cable television frequency issues 
 UHF channels 14 to 43 translate to common cable-ready channels 65 to 94 (add 51).
 UHF channels 44 to 83 translate to rarely used cable TV channels 100 to 139 (add 56).
 Cable-ready channels 6, 95, 96, and 97 have audio carriers which overlap FM radio stations (87.7, 95.7, 101.7 and 107.7).
 Cable-ready channels 57 to 61 overlap the 70cm amateur radio band and can be used for amateur television.
 Cable-ready channel 64 is within the Family Radio Service and General Mobile Radio Service (GMRS) band. 
 Cable-ready channel 23 overlaps with Japanese channel 12.

Historical band plans

Cable television

Harmonically-related carriers (HRC) 
Harmonically-related carriers (HRC) is a system for assigning television channel numbers to bands of frequencies over a cable television network. William Grant, in his book, states:
"By harmonically relating the carrier frequencies themselves it is … possible to improve system performance. This does not reduce the beats produced, but positions them within the system transmission spectrum, such that they are more tolerable. In effect, all signal carriers are spaced precisely at 6 MHz apart, and thus, all beats generated are at 6 MHz increments.

Since the television signals are vestigial sideband modulation, if the beat products can be manipulated to fall on or near the Radio frequency carriers themselves, they are much less offensive."

Incrementally-related carriers (IRC) 
Incrementally-related carriers (IRC) is a system for assigning television channel numbers to bands of frequencies over a cable television network. The IRC plan attempts to minimize distortion products by deriving all video carrier signals from a common source. The IRC system assigns channel frequencies (for the Pan-American NTSC-M system) spaced 6 MHz apart. In an IRC system, the VHF channels are at their off-air frequencies except for channels 5 and 6, which will be 2 MHz higher than usual.

Both HRC and IRC systems have the added advantage of allowing for one extra channel to be positioned between channels four and five, as the gap between them increases from 4 MHz wide to 6 MHz wide. It is often mapped as channel one or channels 2, 3, and 4 become channels 1, 2, and 3, and the new one becomes channel 5.

Channel frequencies 
These frequencies are used for both NTSC-based analog television and QAM-based digital television. Band plans for Pan-American American cable television systems are standardized in EIA standard 542-B.

Channels 57 to 61, and 143 to 145, are used in amateur television.
 
NOTE: Frequencies given are for luminance carriers. For channel center frequencies, add 1.75 MHz.

Channel usage 
Cable channels 98 and 99 (A2 and A1, 108-120 MHz), if used, have appeared as channel 00 and 01 respectively on some cable boxes.

See also 
 Australasian television frequencies
 Broadcast television systems, including:
 ATSC
 DVB
 NTSC
 NTSC-J
 PAL
 RCA
 SECAM
 Early television stations
 European cable television frequencies
 Knife-edge effect
 Moving image formats
 Multichannel television sound
 Television channel frequencies
 Ultra high frequency
 Very high frequency

References

External links 
 ARRL – TV Channel, CATV and FM Broadcast Frequencies by Kevin K. Custer (W3KKC)
 What ever happened to Channel 1? – J. W. Reiser, based on a Radio-Electronics article of the same name by David A. Ferre
 Post-transition U.S. digital TV channel assignments as of 1 August 2007

Bandplans
Communications in North America
North America